Pieris Pieri (born 1996) is a Cypriot alpine ski racer.

He competed at the 2015 World Championships in Beaver Creek, USA, in the giant slalom.

References

1996 births
Cypriot male alpine skiers
Living people
Place of birth missing (living people)